The 2016 Geneva Open (also known as the 2016 Banque Eric Sturdza Geneva Open for sponsorship reasons) was a men's tennis tournament played on outdoor clay courts. It was the 14th edition of the Geneva Open and part of the ATP World Tour 250 series of the 2016 ATP World Tour. It took place at the Tennis Club de Genève in Geneva, Switzerland, from May 15 through May 21, 2016.

Singles main draw entrants

Seeds 

 Rankings are as of May 9, 2016.

Other entrants 
The following players received wildcards into the singles main draw:
  Marin Čilić
  David Ferrer
  Janko Tipsarević

The following players received entry from the qualifying draw:
  Andreas Beck
  Evgeny Donskoy
  Christian Garín
  Roberto Ortega Olmedo

The following player received entry as a lucky loser:
  Florian Mayer

Withdrawals 
Before the tournament
  Marcos Baghdatis →replaced by  Mikhail Youzhny
  Philipp Kohlschreiber →replaced by  Ernests Gulbis
  John Millman →replaced by  Ričardas Berankis

Retirements 
  Denis Istomin

Doubles main draw entrants

Seeds 

 Rankings are as of May 9, 2016.

Other entrants 
The following pairs received wildcards into the doubles main draw:
  Victor Hănescu /  Constantin Sturdza
  Manuel Peña López /  Janko Tipsarević

Finals

Singles 

  'Stan Wawrinka defeated  Marin Čilić, 6–4, 7–6(13–11)

Doubles 

  Steve Johnson /  Sam Querrey defeated  Raven Klaasen /  Rajeev Ram, 6–4, 6–1

References

External links 
 Official website